Upthegrove Beach is an unincorporated community in Okeechobee County, Florida, United States. It is located on US 441/US 98, on the northeastern shore of Lake Okeechobee.

History
Upthegrove Beach was named for the Upthegrove (originally Op Den Graef) family, including Union Army Captain William Hendry Upthegrove and others. Robert Upthegrove, later one of the inaugural Okeechobee County commissioners, settled in the area circa 1912. His son, Clarence Dewitt Upthegrove (Dewitt), at one time worked for Thomas Edison in Fort Myers, and later owned a heavy equipment operation that helped build the Herbert Hoover Dike around Lake Okeechobee and was the Supervisor of Elections for Palm Beach County. Another family member, Laura Upthegrove, also known as The Queen of the Everglades, was a member of the notorious Ashley Gang, and was the subject of the 1973 movie Little Laura and Big John.

Geography

References

External links

Unincorporated communities in Okeechobee County, Florida
Unincorporated communities in Florida
Populated places on Lake Okeechobee